Zdeněk Matějovský is a retired slalom canoeist who competed for Czechoslovakia in the mid-to-late 1950s. He won a bronze medal in the folding K-1 team event at the 1955 ICF Canoe Slalom World Championships in Tacen.

References

Czechoslovak male canoeists
Possibly living people
Year of birth missing
Medalists at the ICF Canoe Slalom World Championships